Gail Chasey (born April 1, 1944) is an American politician and a Democratic member of the New Mexico House of Representatives representing District 18 since January 1997. She is married to former Attorney General of New Mexico and Speaker of the New Mexico House of Representatives David L. Norvell.

Education
Chasey earned her PhD in special education from University of New Mexico and her JD from the University of New Mexico School of Law.

Political career
In 2019, Chasey introduced legislation that would prohibit disenfranchisement of felons. If the bill is successful, New Mexico would become the third state (in addition to Maine and Vermont) to allow felons to vote while serving sentences.

Elections 

1996 When District 18 Democratic Representative Cisco McSorley ran for New Mexico Senate, Chasey, as Gail C. Beam, ran in the four-way June 4, 1996 Democratic Primary, winning with 964 votes (53.5%) in a field which included later state Senator Daniel Ivey-Soto; Beam won the three-way November 5, 1996 General election against Green candidate Robert Anderson and Independent candidate Jeff Gittelman.
1998 Beam was unopposed for both the June 2, 1998 Democratic Primary, winning with 1,361 votes and the November 3, 1998 General election, winning with 5,064 votes.
2000 Beam was unopposed for both the 2000 Democratic Primary, winning with 1,372 votes and the November 7, 2000 General election, winning with 8,664 votes.
2002 Beam was unopposed for both the 2002 Democratic Primary, winning with 1,786 votes and the November 5, 2002 General election, winning with 5,946 votes.
2004 Beam was unopposed for both the June 1, 2004 Democratic Primary, winning with 2,000 votes and the November 2, 2004 General election, winning with 10,255 votes.
2006 As Gail Chasey, she was challenged in the June 6, 2006 Democratic Primary, winning with 1,434 votes (78.1%) and won the November 7, 2006 General election with 7,049 votes (82.8%) against Republican nominee Lance Klafeta.
2008 Chasey was unopposed for both the June 8, 2008 Democratic Primary, winning with 2,190 votes and the November 4, 2008 General election, winning with 10,237 votes.
2010 Chasey was unopposed for both the June 1, 2010 Democratic Primary, winning with 1,599 votes and the November 2, 2010 General election, winning with 6,608 votes.
2012 Chasey was unopposed for the June 5, 2012 Democratic Primary, winning with 2,434 votes and the November 6, 2012 General election, winning with 10,034 votes (81.1%) against Republican nominee Tyson Cosper.

References

External links
Official page at the New Mexico Legislature
Campaign site

Gail Chasey at Ballotpedia
Gail Chasey Beam at the National Institute on Money in State Politics

Place of birth missing (living people)
Living people
Democratic Party members of the New Mexico House of Representatives
New Mexico lawyers
Politicians from Albuquerque, New Mexico
University of New Mexico alumni
University of New Mexico School of Law alumni
Women state legislators in New Mexico
21st-century American politicians
21st-century American women politicians
1944 births